Executive Order 13470 was issued by U.S. President President Bush on July 30, 2008. It amended Executive Order 12333 to strengthen the role of the Director of National Intelligence.

See also 
Executive order
List of United States federal executive orders

References

American intelligence gathering law
13470